A digital conversation is a scripted dialogue which takes place between a person and a computer via any digital medium from web browsers and PDAs to mobile phones and Interactive television.

Introduction

A digital conversation is scripted by a human, uploaded to a server where it can be accessed as a web service by other humans (consumers, employees etc.) and used to impart information to them, whether that information is advising them on the best camera to buy, helping them tailor make a credit card or engaging them in an interactive book.

A digital conversation can be undertaken simultaneously from multiple digital channels. The means used to access a digital conversation do not matter much as you will be calling the same digital conversation. This means that any changes made to a digital conversation are reflected across all channels immediately which allows digital conversations to evolve.

Digital conversations are designed to engage consumers in a conversation where the goal is find out what they want and guide them towards achieving it. Many perceive such dialogue marketing as the way forward, and digital conversations provide a solution to delivering this at scale as it moves away from a traditional one-way stream of information with a consumer (offering every consumer the same choices). It also moves towards a dialogue, finding out and giving them what they want. This movement is seen as essential by many:

{{quote|"The past two years have witnessed the first examples of true two-way marketing conversations between customers and some of the world’s leading consumer brands. Driven by a confluence of innovation, competition and big shifts in consumer behaviour, the dialogue between brands and their customers is replacing the traditional marketing monologue"|The Future of Marketing: From Monologue to Dialogue
The Economist, September 2006}}

In the same New York Times article, Robert M. Greenberg then states that he wants to "engage (consumers) in digital conversations that are so entertaining, involving and valuable that they won't want to ignore them." The key word here is "engage". Digital conversations are created to be, in essence, human interactions and dialogue with one human removed. Unlike Bots and Avatars, digital conversations are scripted, and this may well lead to more human like interactions.

The digital conversation Bio-System
Digital conversations consist of a four-stage "bio-system":

Create  Consisting of the preliminary creation and refining of the digital conversation including its front end

Interact  Whereby consumers engage with the digital conversation

Understand  The usage data of every consumer engaged with a Conversation is automatically stored and aggregated and can be viewed quickly and easily

Adapt  This usage data may lead to changes to the digital conversation which are reflected in real time across all channels (as the Conversation is called from one source no matter what the medium accessing it).

Creation: Scripting a digital conversation

Each digital conversation is made up of a dialogue based script consisting of a narrative and choices with pathways that lead to Outcomes. It is the user, through their choices, who decides which pathway to follow. The script takes the form of a decision tree and is the backbone of the digital conversation. Each Decision-Tree defines two or more Pathways. The end point of a Pathway is an Outcome or a loosely coupled Link to another digital conversation enabling longer digital conversation flows.

By embracing the concepts of Web 2.0 and allowing infinite numbers of digital conversations to be linked, this can allow hugely complex subjects to be tackled. One digital conversation written by an expert in Europe can be linked to an existing digital conversation written by an expert in Africa. This allows in theory, vast knowledge landscapes made up of components.

A digital conversation can contain good dialogue or bad dialogue. Good dialogue typically means the aggregated interaction of each Dialogue-Step is undertaken in less than five seconds. This means a person can read and understand a Dialogue-Step after one read through and wants to continue to the next Dialogue-Step.

Bad dialogue has the opposite effect. Unclear language, for example, can cause confusion and have an adverse effect on a user, worst-case scenario is when a user leaves a digital conversation in despair. Thanks to the available Metrics, such problems can be spotted quickly (numerous users exiting on one particular step indicates an issue with that step) and acted upon, with the dialogue changed as and when needed.

So, the development of a good digital conversation which will engage users requires a combination of skills in particular:

 Two-way communication
 Decision tree logic
 Behavioural economics

A digital conversation can be created for any scripted dialogue. Thus, it is suited for marketing, sales, support, practices, guides, policies, procedures, and much more.

Interaction
Digital conversations can be accessed and thus engaged with in numerous ways, whether by browser (see image to the left), mobile phone (see image above) or even voice.

Due to the Web Service nature of digital conversations, the front ends designed to access them can be extremely diverse (see Links section for a number of examples) and thus are able to reflect branding needs or the needs of the user (for example large type for partially sighted users).

One of the exciting recent developments has been the use of digital conversations to drive Avatars.

Web 4.0 Avatar
One of the trends of recent years has been the humanizing of digital channels, giving a face to things which are not human. This has led to the creation of avatars (also known as bots or chatter-bots) artificial intelligences with which users can “converse”. The success of such bots varies greatly. There are a few which respond in a convincingly human way. It is no great mystery why they are commonly referred to as “Bots” often resulting in a stilted, mechanical interaction where straying off a recognized path can lead to poor responses. However, this has not stopped their spread across the commercial world, with several high-profile companies adopting them as part of their customer services.

Avatars such as IKEA's Anna have generated interest both in the business community and among the public. The idea of an artificial intelligence being able to respond intelligently to your questions is indeed an exciting one. However, do these bots really manage it? Or are they just human faced Avatars disguising a search engine beneath?

Web 2.0 Avatars, powered by digital conversations, provide a level of immersion not found in these bots. Why? Because digital conversations are scripted, just like any good book or film. And like books and films they are designed to guide a user, through high quality dialogue and interactions, to an outcome. Along with this, the ability to understand user interactions through Decision Metrics means that these Web 2.0 Avatars can be adapted to emergent demands as they appear. The dialogue can be improved and built up as and when needed.

Understanding: Measurement and metrics
The automated recording of a digital conversation establishes the analytical science of interaction at scale. As a person interacts with a digital conversation service, each Dialogue-Step is recorded verbatim with a date and time step. Anonymous recording of consumers usage provides aggregated emergent patterns without infringing data privacy.

This measurement, providing the aggregated performance of each Dialogue-Step, Pathway and Outcome provides the scientific basis for Demand-Sensing allowing behavioral data to become quantifiable.

Adaptation: Evolving dialogue
Once the usage data has been viewed and understood, it may well be necessary to react by changing or amending the digital conversation.

Notes

References
The Economist Intelligence Unit. "From Monologue to Dialogue", The Economist, September 7, 2006. Accessed September 10, 2006
Bob McDowall. "Dialogue Marketing: Part 2 - a solution", IT-Analysis.com, July 20, 2005. Accessed July 20, 2005
Timothy L. O'Brien "Madison Avenue's 30-Second Spot Remover", The New York Times, February 12, 2006. Accessed May 30, 2007
Terry Schurter. "There really are new ways to approach old problems", IT-Analysis.com'', May 22, 2006. Accessed May 22, 2006

Computing and society
Computer-mediated communication